Little Big Shots is a Philippine variety television series that premiered on August 12, 2017, on ABS-CBN and the first season ended on December 31, 2017, the show concluded 42 episodes. It is an adaptation of the hit American TV show Little Big Shots shown on NBC, created by Ellen DeGeneres and Steve Harvey who was also the host of the original. The show is hosted by Billy Crawford. The show features children aged 3 to 13 demonstrating various talents and engaging in conversation with Crawford.

Format
The show, unlike other talent shows like Got Talent, has no judges, winners or losers. In each episode, Billy Crawford talks to a 3- to 13-year-old child about their talent, before performing it in front of a studio audience. Some talents shown in the show include singing, dancing, arts, sports, martial arts, academics, and gymnastics.

References

External links
 ABS-CBN - TV Shows - Little Big Shots - About

ABS-CBN original programming
2017 Philippine television series debuts
Philippine reality television series
Philippine television series based on American television series
Television series by Warner Bros. Television Studios
Filipino-language television shows
Television series about children
Television series about teenagers